The National Victory Celebration was held in Washington, D.C., United States, on June 8, 1991, to celebrate the conclusion of the Gulf War. It was the largest American military parade since World War II. 8,000 Desert Storm troops marched in the national parade. A small group of Vietnam veterans also took part in the parade. General Norman Schwarzkopf Jr., the commander of the Desert Storm forces, led the parade. The parade took place on Constitution Avenue, Pennsylvania Avenue, and across the Memorial Bridge. The elaborate parade, which cost $12 million, was criticized by opponents because they claimed it to be militaristic.

The celebration helped to set a single day Metrorail record of 786,358 trips, breaking the record of 604,089 trips set during the inauguration of George H. W. Bush in 1989. The record would last until the first inauguration of Bill Clinton in 1993. It also set a weekend record which would last 17 years until it was broken in 2010 by the Rally to Restore Sanity and/or Fear.

See also
 New York at War, 1942 mobilization parade
 New York City Victory Parade of 1946
 Grand Review of the Armies

References

External links

 Full Footage of the Parade

1991 in Washington, D.C.
Aftermath of the Gulf War
Victory parades
1991 in military history
June 1991 events in the United States
Military parades in the United States